Emilio Andrés Falla Buchely (born 12 June 1986) is an Ecuadorian racing cyclist who represents Ecuador in BMX. He represented Ecuador at the 2008 And 2012 Summer Olympics in the men's BMX event.

Career highlights
 Three times Olympian: Beijing 2008 London 2012 and Rio 2016  alternate.
 18 times National Champ. for Ecuador.
 7 times Panamerican Champ Amateur.
 2 times Panamerican Champ Junior Men.
 2 bronze medals Panamerican Champ Elite men.
 4 times bronze medals Latin American Champs Elite Men.
 Silver Medal Latin American Champ Elite Men.
 7th place at the World Cup Adelaide Australia.
 2008-2009 World Ranking place #9.
 2009-2010 World Ranking place #19.
 2003-2004 World Ranking place #1 Junior Men.
 Currently competing in VET PRO in United States.

Notes

References

External links
 
 
 

1986 births
Living people
BMX riders
Ecuadorian male cyclists
Olympic cyclists of Ecuador
Cyclists at the 2008 Summer Olympics
Cyclists at the 2012 Summer Olympics
Cyclists at the 2016 Summer Olympics
Pan American Games competitors for Ecuador
Cyclists at the 2011 Pan American Games
Cyclists at the 2015 Pan American Games
Cyclists at the 2019 Pan American Games
Sportspeople from Quito
21st-century Ecuadorian people